Various animals have been proven to be able to become infected with SARS-CoV-2, the virus that causes COVID-19. The Centers for Disease Control and Prevention has stated that it is a low risk that the virus would spread from animals to people.

Coronaviruses are common among some animal species, but this list only shows those who have been proven to carry the virus that causes COVID-19. Most types of animals that can get the virus have not been proven to be able to spread it back to humans.

See also 
 COVID-19 pandemic and animals
 SARS-CoV-2 in mink
 SARS-CoV-2 in white-tailed deer

References

External links 
 SARS-ANI VIS: A Global Open Access Dataset of Reported SARS-CoV-2 Events in Animals

Further reading 

animals
Disease_ecology